Ma Gonzesse (French slang for My Chick) is the name by which the third untitled studio album of French singer-songwriter Renaud is commonly referred to. It was released in 1979 by Polydor Records. Amongst the musicians accompanying Renaud was accordionist Marcel Azzola who had also played with Jacques Brel.

Track listing
All songs were written by Renaud Séchan except where noted.

Side one
 "Ma gonzesse" (lyrics: Renaud Séchan; music: Alain Brice) – 3:31
 "Sans dec'" – 3:12
 "La Tire à Dédé" – 3:42
 "Ch'timi rock" – 2:45
 "J'ai la vie qui m'pique les yeux" – 3:35

Side two
 "C'est mon dernier bal" – 4:04
 "Le Tango de Massy-Palaiseau" – 2:53
 "Chanson pour Pierrot" – 2:50
 "Salut manouche" – 4:10
 "Peau aime" (live) – 4:12

Tracks 1 and 8 were included on the compilation The Meilleur of Renaud (75–85). Tracks 1 and 6 were also included on the CD Ma Compil. Tracks 1, 5 and 8 were covered for the tribute album La Bande à Renaud.

References

1979 albums
Renaud albums
Polydor Records albums